Revaca is a railway station in Moldova. It is located near Chișinău International Airport.

References 

Railway stations in Moldova